is a Japanese actor and voice actor who has portrayed characters for stage, films, television and video games. Yoshihiko also has a history of theatre, including the Live Act "BlazBlue" ~Continuum Shift~ as Jin Kisaragi (2014), Ruritsubame Blues (2015), Cute High Earth Defense Club Love! as Zaō Ryū (2016), Jiden: Hibi no Ya Yo Chiruran (2019), and Bakuman THE STAGE as Takagi Akito (2021).

Selected filmography

Television

Film

Video games
 Ikemen vampire (2017) as Vincent van Gogh
 Sengoku Night Blood (2017) as Uesugi Kagekatsu
 Granblue Fantasy Versus (2019) as Fehr
 Wind boys! (2020)
 ALTDEUS: Beyond Chronos (2020) as Aoba Iwaza

References

External links
Aramaki Yoshihiko Official Site
aramaki.yoshi on Instagram
荒牧慶彦 on Twitter
荒牧慶彦 official on Twitter

1990 births
Living people